Sembawang MRT station is an elevated Mass Rapid Transit (MRT) station on the North–south line (NSL). Located in Sembawang, Singapore along Sembawang Road, the station is close to the Sun Plaza shopping centre and Sembawang Bus Interchange. The station is operated by SMRT Trains.

Originally planned to be built later than the other stations of the Woodlands extension, the station's construction was brought forward when plans were revised in November 1992. Completed along with the other Woodlands extension stations on 10 February 1996, Sembawang station has the most number of bicycle stands for cyclists working at Sembawang Shipyard. The number of bicycle parking spaces further increased through the National Cycling Plan in 2010. The station features a kampung-style roof and is also integrated with other transportation modes.

History

After the Branch line (from the Jurong East to Choa Chu Kang stations) opened in 1990, the Woodlands MRT line was envisioned so as to connect between Yishun and Choa Chu Kang stations. The station was among the six Woodlands line extension stations announced in November 1991. In June 1991, the station's location was moved south from its original location so as to minimise destruction to the Senoko Bird sanctuary. It was initially planned to build the station at a later stage along with the Kadut station.

In November 1992, however, the station's construction was brought forward to serve more residents moving into the Woodlands area. During the construction, a section of Canberra Road had to be temporarily closed from 4 to 6 May 1994 to install the construction beam between the Sembawang and Yishun stations.

Then-communications minister Mah Bow Tan made a few visits to the station site, first in May 1993 and on 13 January 1996. The station opened on 10 February 1996 along with the other stations on the Woodlands Extension.

Sembawang station was part of the first batch of ten stations to have additional bicycle parking facilities under the National Cycling Plan announced in 2010. In 2012, half-height platform screen doors were installed at this station as part of the Land Transport Authority's (LTA) programme to improve safety in MRT stations. Between 2012 and 2013, high-volume low-speed fans were installed at this station to improve ventilation at the elevated station's platforms.

Station overview
The station is a two-level overground structure with one island platform and four exits, mostly to the residential and retail areas, as well as bus services. Being part of the NSL, the station is operated by SMRT Trains. Located along Sembawang Way, the station serves the Singapore neighbourhood of Sembawang.

Like most stations on the Woodlands Extension, it has a kampung-style roof. The station is integrated with other transportation modes, with longer sheltered bus bays of  that can accommodate up to three buses alongside taxi stands. To address the higher demand by Sembawang Shipyard workers cycling to work, Sembawang station features more than 350 bicycle stands – the most among the Woodlands Extension stations.

Around the Station 

 Sun Plaza
 Sembawang Bus Interchange
 Sembawang Neighbourhood Police Centre
 Jelutong Community Club
 Canberra Community Club
 Sembawang Primary School
 Sembawang Secondary School

Notes and references

Notes

References

External links
 

Railway stations in Singapore opened in 1996
Sembawang
Mass Rapid Transit (Singapore) stations